"Tunnel of Fear" is the 20th episode of the first series of the 1960s cult British spy-fi television series The Avengers, starring Ian Hendry, Patrick Macnee and Ingrid Hafner, and guest starring John Salew, Anthony Bate and Miranda Connell. It was recorded on 405-line monochrome videotape on 3 August 1961 and was first broadcast by ABC on 5 August 1961.  It is one of the three known complete series 1 episodes to have survived being purged from the ABC archives and was rediscovered in 2016 when it was found in a private collection. The episode was directed by Guy Verney and written by John Kruse.

Plot
Top secret information is leaking into Europe from a funfair somewhere in Southend, and Harry Black, a recent escapee from prison, is rumoured to have worked there. Closer examination reveals that the ghost train is more scary than it looks and the owner of the funfair, Jack Wickram, is arranging the kidnappings. Trick cigarettes allow Steed to bluff the enemy into submission and Harry Black is proved innocent as he was hypnotised and framed.

Cast
Ian Hendry as Dr. David Keel
Patrick Macnee as John Steed
Ingrid Hafner as Carol Wilson
Anthony Bate as Harry Black
Miranda Connell as Claire
Doris Rogers as Mrs. Mary Black
John Salew as Jack Wickram
Douglas Muir as One-Ten
Douglas Rye as Billy
Stanley Platts as Maxie Lardner
Bill Maxam as George Milner
Nancy Roberts as Madame Zenobia
Morris Perry as Police Sergeant 
Julie Samuel as Rosie
Juno as Puppy

Recovery
On 3 October 2016, it was announced that a pristine condition 16mm film telerecording of the episode had been recovered from a private collector and was later screened in London on 12 November. As of 2022 it is the latest known surviving episode to feature the character of David Keel.

References

The Avengers (season 1) episodes